The J. Willard Marriott Library is the main academic library of the University of Utah in Salt Lake City, Utah. The university library has had multiple homes since the first University of Utah librarian was appointed in 1850. The current building was opened in 1968 and named for J. Willard Marriott, founder of Marriott International, in 1969. The University of Utah Press and Red Butte Press are divisions of the Marriott Library.

History

The first University of Utah librarian was appointed in 1850, the same year the school was founded. University president John R. Park opened a library and reading room stocked with his personal collection of books on loan to the university in 1874. The library moved to the LeRoy Cowles Building in 1900 and the George Thomas Library Building in 1935, both on Presidents Circle. The current five-story building was opened in 1968 and was named for J. Willard Marriott in 1969 when he contributed $1 million for library collections, the largest single contribution ever received by the university at that time.

The library was expanded  in 1996, which almost doubled the library's size, and was expanded again during a major renovation between 2005 and 2009. The purpose of this renovation was to improve the seismic stability of the building, provide clearer pathways through the building, improve environmental controls, and allow for more natural light. Several additions were also made to the building including an automated storage and retrieval system that can store up to 2 million items, a larger computer lab, additional classrooms and teaching labs, a new indoor café, a rooftop garden, and additional study areas including the George S. Eccles Grand Reading Room.

Collections
The library's Special Collections department collects, preserves, and makes available books, periodicals, documents, photographs, films, and original materials, particularly those documenting the history of Utah, the Mormons, the West, the Middle East, and the University of Utah. These collections include the papers of Marriner Stoddard Eccles, Chairman of the Federal Reserve from 1934 to 1938; David O. McKay, ninth President of the Church of Jesus Christ of Latter-day Saints; Leonidas Ralph Mecham, Director of the Administrative Office of the United States Courts from 1985 to 2006; and Wallace Stegner, winner of the Pulitzer Prize for Fiction in 1972. Materials are accessible to all patrons, regardless of their status.

The library hosts over 100 unique digital collections, many of which include items from Special Collections. Digital collections include USpace, Utah Digital Newspapers, the Western Soundscape Archive, and the Western Waters Digital Library. The library also hosts the Mountain West Digital Library, a digital collaborative program of the Utah Academic Library Consortium. The library provides access to print on demand books via an Espresso Book Machine.

The Aziz S. Atiya Middle East Library, which is located in the Marriott Library, is named after the founder of the University of Utah Middle East Center, Aziz Suryal Atiya, and is the fifth largest library for Middle East studies in North America.

The Katherine W. Dumke Fine Arts & Architecture Library collection includes artist's books, catalogue raisonnés, graphic novels, sheet music, and other arts books and periodicals.

Artwork in the library's collection includes pieces by Anna Campbell Bliss, a Salt Lake City-based artist.

References

External links

 
 Marriott Library Special Collections
 Marriott Library Digital Collections

University and college academic libraries in the United States
Buildings and structures at the University of Utah
Libraries in Utah
Library buildings completed in 1968
University and college buildings completed in 1968